
Gmina Iłowa is an urban-rural gmina (administrative district) in Żagań County, Lubusz Voivodeship, in western Poland.

Villages
Apart from the town of Iłowa, Gmina Iłowa contains the villages and settlements of Borowe, Czerna, Czyżówek, Jankowa Żagańska, Klików, Konin Żagański, Kowalice, Nowoszów, Szczepanów, Wilkowisko and Żaganiec.

Neighbouring gminas
Gmina Iłowa is bordered by the towns of Gozdnica and Żagań, and by the gminas of Osiecznica, Węgliniec, Wymiarki, Żagań and Żary.

Twin towns – sister cities

Gmina Iłowa is twinned with:
 Blanzy, France
 Jänschwalde, Germany
 Rietschen, Germany

References

Ilowa
Żagań County